A consequent is the second half of a hypothetical proposition.  In the standard form of such a proposition, it is the part that follows "then". In an implication, if P implies Q, then P is called the antecedent and Q is called the consequent. In some contexts, the consequent is called the apodosis.

Examples:

 If , then .

 is the consequent of this hypothetical proposition.

 If  is a mammal, then  is an animal.

Here, " is an animal" is the consequent.

 If computers can think, then they are alive.

"They are alive" is the consequent.

The consequent in a hypothetical proposition is not necessarily a consequence of the antecedent.

 If monkeys are purple, then fish speak Klingon.

"Fish speak Klingon" is the consequent here, but intuitively is not a consequence of (nor does it have anything to do with) the claim made in the antecedent that "monkeys are purple.

See also
 Antecedent (logic)
 Conjecture
 Necessity and sufficiency

References

Conditionals
Logical_consequence